Matt Timson is a British comic book artist who resides in Leicester.

Biography
Timson has done a lot of work (especially covers) for British small press comics including Solar Wind, The End Is Nigh and FutureQuake, as well as working as a freelance illustrator.

In recent years he has begun to get professional comics work, on Popgun with Leah Moore and John Reppion, and most recently on Impaler, after the title moved from Image Comics to Top Cow. Comics critic Timothy Callahan in a review of Impaler #3 said:

Bibliography

Comics
Interior comics work includes:
 "The Ripper" (written by Arthur Wyatt, in FutureQuake #1, 2003) 
 "The Omnocular Man" (written by Paul Scott, in Solar Wind #2, 2003 & #3, 2004)
 "54 Jones" (written by Paul Scott, in Omnivistascope Model One, 2005 & Model Two, 2006)
 "Labour 7" (in Twelve a - retelling of the 12 tasks of Herakles)
 "The Last War" (written by Al Ewing, in The End Is Nigh #2, 2005)
 "Death Squid" (written by Paul Scott, in Solar Wind #1, 2003 & #2, 2003)
 Gutsville #2 (written by Simon Spurrier, with art by Frazer Irving, Image Comics, 2007)
 "Deadeye" (written by Leah Moore and John Reppion, in Popgun #1 and 2, Image Comics, 2007, 2008)
 Impaler (with William Harms, 5-issue limited series, Top Cow Productions, December 2008 - March 2010, ongoing, tpb, 160 pages, August 2010)
 "Zip" (with Andi Ewington and 44 other artists, in Forty-Five, anthology graphic novel, Com.x, February 2010)
 The Darkness #89 (with Joshua Hale Fialkov, Top Cow, January 2011)

Covers

Solar Wind #1
The End Is Nigh #1 (right)
FutureQuake #4
 Violent #8
 Omnivistascope Model One

Awards
2010: Nominated for "Favourite Newcomer Artist" Eagle Award

Notes

References

External links

Matt Timson's blog
The making of Impaler by Matt Timson, Comic Monsters.com
FULL ISSUE - Top Cow's 'Impaler #1', Newsarama, March 11, 2009
Impaler #1-3 review, Ain't It Cool News

Year of birth missing (living people)
Place of birth missing (living people)
20th-century births
20th-century British artists
21st-century British artists
British comics artists
Living people
People from Leicester